Wish I May is a 2016 Philippine television drama romance series broadcast by GMA Network. Directed by Neal del Rosario, it stars Bianca Umali and Miguel Tanfelix. It premiered on January 18, 2016 on the network's Afternoon Prime line up replacing The Half Sisters. The series concluded on May 20, 2016 with a total of 88 episodes. It was replaced by Magkaibang Mundo in its timeslot.

The series is streaming online on YouTube.

Premise
Olivia will be separated from her daughter, Carina because of her parents. In time, they will eventually meet. Though due to her sickness chimerism, she will continue to be separated from Carina. Olivia will also meet Clark again — the person she loves who is the father of Tristan, who will become a close friend of Carina.

Cast and characters

Lead cast
 Bianca Umali as Carina "Cacai" Pizarro Gomez
 Miguel Tanfelix as Tristan "Tan-tan" Ramos Buenavista

Supporting cast
Camille Prats as Olivia Pizarro-Gomez
Mark Anthony Fernandez as Clark Gomez
Alessandra de Rossi as Loretta Atienza-Vergara
Rochelle Pangilinan as Audrey Ramos
Glydel Mercado as Barbara Pizarro
Neil Ryan Sese as Gabo Villafuerte
Ash Ortega as Eunice Montes
Sancho Delas Alas as Toper
Prince Villanueva as Dave Montes
Sandy Talag as Donna
Aifha Medina as Jeanette
Marnie Lapus as Doris

Guest cast
Juan Rodrigo as Edward Pizarro
Mark Herras as Andrew Vergara
Franco Lagusad as Bernard Labangon
Mon Confiado as Mr. Chua
Arthur Solinap as Carlos Buenavista
Eva Darren as Mamita Linsangan 
TJ Trinidad as Lance Delgado
Lovely Abella as Meryl
Dale Rossly as Nikki
Mayton Eugenio as Paula

Ratings
According to AGB Nielsen Philippines' Mega Manila household television ratings, the pilot episode of Wish I May earned a 17.1% rating. While the final episode scored an 18.4% rating.

Accolades

References

External links
 

2016 Philippine television series debuts
2016 Philippine television series endings
Filipino-language television shows
GMA Network drama series
Philippine romance television series
Television shows set in Manila